Douglas Jones MBE, FRS, FRSE (10 January 1922 – 29 November 2013) was a mathematician known for his work in the field of electromagnetism.

He was described by The Scotsman as "one of the most outstanding British mathematicians of his generation".

Life
Jones was born 10 January 1922 in Corby Northamptonshire, and was educated at Wolverhampton Grammar School. He was the eldest of four children.

In 1940, Jones began studying at Corpus Christi College, Oxford University.

In his spare time, Jones was known to enjoy golf, walking and photography. He and his wife Ivy had two children.

Career
After joining the RAF in 1942, he led a research team looking at equipment for night fighter operations. Awarded MBE in 1945 for his work with the RAF.

Jones graduated MA from Oxford in 1947, and then worked as a lecturer at Manchester University. In 1957 he was appointed chair of Mathematics at the University of Keele.

During his time at Keele, Jones wrote the book The Theory of Electromagnetism which established him as a leader in this field.

In 1965, Jones was appointed to the Ivory Chair of Applied Mathematics at Queen's College, Dundee, then part of the University of St Andrews, but which became the University of Dundee in 1967.

Jones retired from the University of Dundee in 1992, gaining the title Emeritus Professor.

Honours and awards
1945: Awarded MBE
1967: Elected Fellow of the Royal Society of Edinburgh
1968: Elected Fellow of the Royal Society
 Awarded Honorary D.Sc by the University of Strathclyde
 Elected an Honorary Fellow of Corpus Christi College, Oxford
 Awarded Marconi prize of the Institute of Electrical Engineers
 Awarded van der Pol Gold Medal of the International Union of Radio Science
1973: Awarded Keith Prize of the Royal Society of Edinburgh.
1987: Awarded Naylor Prize and Lectureship of the London Mathematical Society

Publications
 Electrical and Mechanical Oscillations (1961)
 Theory of Electromagnetism (1964)
 Generalised Functions (1966)
 Introductory Analysis (vol. 1, 1969; vol 2, 1970)
 Methods in Electromagnetic Wave Propagation (1979, 2nd edn 1994)
 Elementary Information Theory (1979)
 The Theory of Generalised Functions (1982)
 Differential Equations and Mathematical Biology (1983, 3rd edn 2010)
 Acoustic and Electromagnetic Waves (1986)
 Assembly Programming and the 8086 Microprocessor (1988)
 80×86 Assembly Programming (1991)
 Introduction to Asymptotics (1997)

References

See also
 Article from German language Wikipedia w:de:Douglas Samuel Jones

1922 births
2013 deaths
People educated at Wolverhampton Grammar School
Academics of Keele University
Academics of the Victoria University of Manchester
Academics of the University of St Andrews
Academics of the University of Dundee
Alumni of Corpus Christi College, Oxford
20th-century British mathematicians
21st-century British mathematicians
Fellows of Corpus Christi College, Oxford
Fellows of the Royal Society
Fellows of the Royal Society of Edinburgh
Members of the Order of the British Empire
Royal Air Force personnel of World War II